Prone Mortal Form/Innocents is a double CD/vinyl re-issue of Only Living Witness's two albums.

CD version

Disc 1 – Prone Mortal Form

2006 bonus tracks

 Tracks 11–15 taken from the 1992's Prone Mortal Form (demo).

Disc 2 – Innocents 

2006 bonus tracks

 Track 11 recorded during the "Innocents" sessions. Tracks 12 & 13 taken from the Freaklaw 7-inch EP. Tracks 14, 15, 16 taken from the "Innocents" pre-production demo.

Vinyl version
Disc 1 – Prone Mortal Form

Disc 2 – Innocents

References

2006 compilation albums